German submarine U-978 was a World War II Type VIIC U-boat operated by Nazi Germany's Kriegsmarine . She completed the longest underwater patrol of World War II.

Design
German Type VIIC submarines were preceded by the shorter Type VIIB submarines. U-978 had a displacement of  when at the surface and  while submerged. She had two shafts and two  propellers.

U-978 was fitted with five  torpedo tubes (four fitted at the bow and one at the stern), fourteen torpedoes, one  SK C/35 naval gun, 220 rounds, and one twin  C/30 anti-aircraft gun. The boat had a complement of between forty-four and sixty.

Service history
U-978 was commissioned on 12 May 1943 and assigned to 5th U-boat Flotilla for crew training. On 1 August 1944, U-978 was assigned to 3rd U-boat Flotilla for operational service, and completed one patrol with that unit. On 4 September 1944 she was ordered to 11th U-boat Flotilla, beginning service on 5 September. During her second war patrol, U-978 completed the longest underwater Schnorchel patrol of World War II, lasting 68 days, under command of Guenther Pulst. The record-breaking patrol began on 9 October 1944 when she left Bergen, Norway and ended on 16 December when she returned to Bergen from her patrol. During her two patrols U-978, did not sink any ships, but damaged one ship beyond repair, which displaced .

Fate
U-978 survived the war as did her whole crew, and was surrendered at Trondheim on 9 May 1945. She was sunk on 11 December 1945 during Operation Deadlight by torpedoes at location .

Summary of raiding history

References

Bibliography

Bishop, C. Kriegsmarine U-Boats 1939 –45. Amber Books, 2006.

External links

German Type VIIC submarines
U-boats commissioned in 1943
U-boats sunk in 1945
Operation Deadlight
World War II submarines of Germany
1943 ships
Ships built in Hamburg
Maritime incidents in December 1945